Julio Barrabes (born 14 August 1988) is a French former footballer who is last known to have played as a defender for Villenave.

Career

In 2009, Barrabes signed for Stade Bordelais in the French fifth division after playing for the reserves of French Ligue 1 side Monaco.

Before the second half of the 2010/11 season, he signed for Istra 1961, becoming the first French player to play in Croatia.

In 2011, he signed for French lower league team Lormont.

References

External links
 

French footballers
Expatriate footballers in Croatia
NK Istra 1961 players
Croatian Football League players
Association football defenders
Living people
1988 births
Footballers from Bordeaux
French expatriate footballers
French expatriate sportspeople in Croatia
Rodez AF players
Championnat National 2 players
Championnat National 3 players